Paul Hall may refer to:
 Paul Hall (footballer) (born 1972), Jamaican footballer
 Paul Hall (labor leader) (1914–1980), American labor leader
 Paul R. Hall (born 1976), aka Hassan Abujihaad, former sailor in the United States Navy convicted of supporting terrorism